Autonome Nationalisten (English: Autonomous Nationalists, abbreviated AN) are German, British, Dutch and to a lesser degree Flemish Nationalists, who have adopted some of the far-left and Antifa's organizational concepts (autonomous activism),  demonstration tactics (black bloc), symbolism, and elements of clothing, including Che Guevara T-shirts and keffiyehs. Similar groups have also appeared in some central and eastern European countries, beginning with Poland (starting in 2009), the Czech Republic, Ukraine, Romania and Greece and others.

History 

The phenomenon of the Autonome Nationalisten can be traced to "Freie Nationaliste" (Free Nationalists), "Freie Kräfte" (Free Forces) and "Freie Kameradschaften" (Free Comradeships) movements, which developed in the shadow of the Nationaldemokratische Partei Deutschlands (NPD) (National Democratic Party of Germany) since the late-1980s. The police crackdown on the far-right after re-unification and the wave of banning in the early 1990s ("Deutsche Alternative", "Nationalistische Front", "Freiheitliche Deutsche Arbeiterpartei", among others) forced most of the local extreme far-right militant groups to split into "autonomous nationalist cells" of 5-20 members without a formal membership. Instead of conducting regular meetings, they started to use phones and later Internet for communication and organizing. Local cells formed loose umbrella networks in the regions to coordinate actions. In 2008, Germany's Autonomous Nationalists were estimated to number approximately 400 people, 1% of the country's neo-Nazis. The German Federal Office for the Protection of the Constitution, which provides domestic intelligence for the government, estimated the number of active participants of the far right movement in 2008 around 40,000. According to the Southern Poverty Law Center (SPLC), in 2001 there were 75 extreme-right organizations in Germany with 50,000 members.

The emergence of the Autonome Nationalisten was controversial within the German far right milieu, both because some older activists of the German extreme right objected to their "leftist" image and because the NPD feared they would complicate its efforts to take part in mainstream politics. Also controversial was that Autonome Nationalisten had occasionally expressed sympathy for Islamic extremism, as well as Hezbollah and Hamas for their opposition to Zionism and American imperialism. The same controversies arose among the far right in Poland.

The Autonomous Nationalists in Europe made themselves visible starting from 2003–2004 and are now considered more violent than other members of the European far right. However, as of 2010, according to Miroslav Mareš, their impact in these countries has been limited so far.

Message 

Researchers view the syncretic political movement of the Autonomous Nationalists in Europe as a "strategic concept, organization and subculture – all three terms are possible for the designation of this phenomenon." They emphasize that, 

The Autonomous Nationalists were ideologically inspired by Strasserism. The message of AN shifted to anti-globalist, anti-capitalist, and anti-imperialist ideas. It promotes complete organizational decentralization and autonomy inside the movement.

The adoption of codes and symbols of the far left "Autonome Antifa"  by the "Autonome Nationalisten" coincided with the persistence of vibrant alternative subcultures of the radical left and rejection of traditional skinhead cultural-political templates of behavior of the extreme right. The AN thus see themselves as 'autonomous' from established neo-Nazi programs and structures, developing their own ideological discourse, street message, action repertoire, music scenes and fashion codes. These are often meant to display anti-capitalist and anti-systemic rebellion and opposition to globalization and 'American cultural imperialism'. The AN also raised some social and economic issues, including poverty. At present time, they are firmly entrenched in the neo‐Nazi movement.

Gallery

See also
Bases Autónomas
Black Front
Far-right social centre
Far-right subcultures-
Groupe Union Défense
National-Anarchism
National Bolshevik Party
Nipster
Political soldier
Popular Resistance Association
Third Position

References

Further reading 
 Rechtsextremismus in Berlin, Senatsverwaltung für Inneres und Sport.  
 Decker, Oliver, Marliese Weißmann, Johannes Kiess, und Elmar Brähler. Die Mitte in der Krise. Rechtsextreme Einstellungen in Deutschland. Berlin: Friedrich-Ebert-Stiftung, 2010. 
 Braun, Stephan, Alexander Geisler, und Martin Gerster. Strategien der extremen Rechten: Hintergründe - Analysen - Antworten. Wiesbaden: VS Verlag für Sozialwissenschaften, 2009. 
 Hafeneger, Benno, und Sven Schönfelder. Politische Strategien gegen die extreme Rechte in Parlamenten: Folgen für kommunale Politik und lokale Demokratie : Eine qualitative Studie. Berlin: Friedrich-Ebert-Stiftung, 2007. 
 Peters, Jürgen. "Autonome Nationalisten" die Modernisierung neofaschistischer Jugendkultur. Münster: Unrast, 2009. 
 Roth, Roland. Demokratie braucht Qualität!: Beispiele guter Praxis und Handlungsempfehlungen für erfolgreiches Engagement gegen Rechtsextremismus. Berlin: Friedrich-Ebert-Stiftung, 2010. 
 Schedler, Jan. Autonome Nationalisten. In: Aus Politik und Zeitgeschichte, Nr. 44/2010, S. 20–26, (2010). 
 Schedler, Jan und Alexander Häusler (Hrsg.). Autonome Nationalisten Neonazismus in Bewegung. Wiesbaden: VS Verlag für Sozialwissenschaften, 2011.  
 Schedler, Jan.  The Devil in Disguise: Action Repertoire, Visual Performance and Collective Identity of the Autonomous Nationalists, Nations and Nationalism, V. 20, No. 2: 239-258, (2014).
Schlembach, Raphael. The ‘Autonomous Nationalists’: New developments and contradictions in the German neo-Nazi movement, Interface: A journal for and about social movements, Volume 5 (2): 295 - 318, (November 2013).

External links 
 Autonom.pl Autonomous Nationalists in Poland
 Autonome Nationalisten 
 Autonomous Nationalists: The AN movement in Germany

Third Position
Neo-Nazism in Germany
Syncretic political movements
Neo-Nazi concepts